Ma Non Troppo is the debut album by Slovenian band Silence, released on March 10, 1997 - the year after the band's signing to Chrom Records. It was voted "Album of the month" in "New Life".

Track listing
 "Samuel's Gabriel"  – 4:17
 "La Troia"  – 4:20
 "The Rain"  – 3:30
 "Neglected"  – 3:26
 "In Your Name"  – 4:20
 "The Girl Of My Best Friend"  – 3:26
 "I Love You"  – 3:44
 "Kraljestvo Mačjih Oči"  – 2:46
 "Quasi Vesna"  – 4:52
 "I'm A Memory"  – 4:28
 "#1 Hit Single"  – 2:26*

 * Unlisted bonus track.

Personnel
 Silence is:
 Boris Benko
 Primož Hladnik
 All songs written and arranged by B. Benko, except tracks 8 and 9, written by B. Benko and P. Hladnik. Track 6 written by Ross & Bobrick. All lyrics by B. Benko, except track 6. Samuel's Gabriel features Katja Saponic.
 Produced by Peter Penko at Raingarden 9, Ljubljana.
 Mastering by Christoph Stickel MSM Studios, Munich.
 Editing by Aleš Dvoržak at Kif Kif, Ljubljana.
 Design and photography by Fred Stichnoth.
 Additional musicians:
 Katja Saponjic, vocals: "Samuel's Gabriel".
 Special thanks to: Klavdij, Waldo, Matjaz, Katrin, Ziga, Barbara, Bostjan, Katja Saponjic, Saso Bole, Spela Predan, starsi and everyone at Chrom Records. The rest is silence.
 Realized by: Carl D. Erling and Sönke Held.
 Label: Chrom Records

External links
Silence discography: Ma Non Troppo

1997 albums
Silence (band) albums